Nova Scotia Museum (NSM) is the corporate name for the 28 museums across Nova Scotia, Canada, and is part of the province's tourism infrastructure. The organization manages more than 200 historic buildings, living history sites, vessels, and specialized museums and about one million artifacts and specimens, either directly or through a system of co-operative agreements with societies and local boards. The NSM delivers programs, exhibits and products which provide both local residents and tourists in Nova Scotian communities an opportunity to experience and learn about Nova Scotia's social and natural history.  More than 600,000 people visit the facilities each year.

History
The Nova Scotia Museum was created by the Nova Scotia Museum Act, a provincial legislation.

The Nova Scotia Museum began with the collection of the Mechanics Institute in Halifax, founded in December 1831. The museum was formally established in 1868. The Rev. Dr. David Honeyman was the first curator. He was followed by Harry Piers, who as curator from 1899 to 1940 oversaw a steady expansion of the museum's collection.

Activities
As well as managing and maintaining historical collections, the museum has sponsored the publication of many historical books, pamphlets and other documents.

The museum staff and volunteers undertake a variety of restoration projects, create cultural and natural history displays, and participate in historical reenactments.

The organization also issues Heritage Research Permits, allowing scientists to collect and study fossils and other archaeological artifacts.

Images

Museums
Hours of these locations will be effected by federal, municipal, and provincial holidays. Please check the Nova Scotia Museum website for specific information.

Cape Breton Island

Eastern Shore

Fundy Shore & Annapolis Valley

Halifax Metro

Northumberland Shore

South Shore

Yarmouth & Acadian Shores

Notes

References

External links

Nova Scotia Museum

 
Museums in Nova Scotia